Babacar Sané (born September 19, 2003) also known as Younq Ossoko is a Senegalese professional basketball player for the NBA G League Ignite of the NBA G League. Internationally, he plays for the Senegal national team.

Early life 
Born in the city of Ziguinchor, Sané grew up in Bignona, where he was discovered by the NBA Academy Africa after playing in the SEED Project Hoop Forum.

Professional career

DUC (2022) 
In May 2022, Sané played for Dakar Université Club in the 2022 BAL season as part of the BAL Elevate program in which one player from the NBA Academy was assigned to a roster. On March 5, he made his BAL debut in a 70–85 loss to SLAC and had 8 points and 3 rebounds in 21 minutes. He averaged 4 points off the bench in 10.9 minutes per game.

NBA G League Ignite (2022–present) 
On October 26, 2022, Sané signed with the NBA G League Ignite. On January 18, Sané scored 17 points and grabbed 18 rebounds, a franchise record for most rebounds in a game. He was named to the G League's inaugural Next Up Game for the 2022–23 season.

National team career 
Sané played for Senegal Under-20 at the 2020 FIBA U18 African Championship in Egypt, averaging 14 points per game, and winning a silver medal. He also played in the 2019 FIBA Under-19 Basketball World Cup.

On February 25, 2022, he made his debut for the Senegal national senior team in a World Cup qualifying game against Egypt.

References 

2003 births
Living people
DUC Dakar players
NBA G League Ignite players
People from Ziguinchor
Senegalese expatriate basketball people in the United States
Senegalese men's basketball players
Shooting guards
Small forwards